The Twelve Commandments of Dance is the debut album by German-based English dance-pop duo London Boys, released in 1989. It reached number 2 in the UK Albums Chart and stayed on the chart for 29 weeks.

Other than the charting singles stated in the track listing, two other singles were released: "I'm Gonna Give My Heart" and "Dance Dance Dance".

Track listing
All tracks written by Ralf René Maué.

 "Requiem" – 4:19 (UK No. 4)
 "Kimbaley (My Ma-Mama Say)" – 4:17
 "Harlem Desire" – 3:48 (UK No. 17)
 "Chinese Radio" – 3:49
 "Wichitah Woman" – 3:58
 "My Love" – 3:05 (UK No. 46)
 "London Nights" – 4:02 (UK No. 2)
 "I'm Gonna Give My Heart" – 4:08
 "El Matinero" – 4:14
 "Dance Dance Dance" – 3:56
 "Sandra" – 4:51
 "The Midi Dance" – 3:14

The 2009 remastered reissue released by Cherry Pop Records features extended remixes of tracks 1, 3, 6 and 7

Chart and certifications

Weekly charts

Certifications

References

1989 debut albums
London Boys albums